Peter Christian Assersen (January 5, 1839 – December 6, 1906) was a civil engineer and Rear Admiral in the United States Navy.

Background
Assersen was born January 5, 1839, the youngest of twelve children, on the Midbrød farm in Egersund parish, today located in the municipality of Eigersund, in Rogaland county, Norway. His parents were Asser Johannessen and Malene Rasmusdatter. He left Norway at age 17 as a cabin boy on a bark sailing from the port of Stavanger. He came to the United States in 1859 at age 20.

Military service
During the Civil War, he enlisted in the United States Navy as a master's mate on May 27, 1862, at age 23. He took part in several battles as commander of gunboats. He was made an acting ensign on  November 24, 1862, and was appointed an engineer in the United States Naval Marine Corps.

Assersen was honorably discharged on February 28, 1869, and returned to naval service as a civil engineer on 6 March 1874. Assersen became a lieutenant, captain and in 1889, rear admiral in the United States Navy. Assersen was the chief engineer of Brooklyn Navy Yard and the Norfolk Navy Yard, specializing in building drydocks.

He retired from military service on January 5, 1901, with the rank of rear admiral, and continued on active duty. He died of angina pectoris December 6, 1906 in Brooklyn, and he was buried at the United States Naval Academy in Annapolis.

Personal life
In August 1864 Assersen married Mary Ann Wilson from Brooklyn. She was born May 11, 1867, and died May 10, 1910. They had 7 children, 3 boys and 4 girls. His sons all served in the United States military:
 Henry Raymond Asserson  (1867–?) served as a special engineer during the First World War on General Pershing's staff. He was retired with the rank Major.
 Frederick Asser Asserson  (1878–1931) served in the medical corps in the United States Navy and was retired with the rank Commander.
 William Christian Asserson (1875–1939) served in the United States Navy. In 1901 he served in China in the Boxer Uprising. During World War I he commanded the USS Castine (PG-6), and for some months before the Armistice with Germany he served as chief of staff to the commander of the United States Patrol Squadron in the Mediterranean Sea, in the vicinity of Gibraltar. He retired with the rank of captain. He was awarded the Navy Cross for his efforts in World War I.

References

Other sources
Ulvestad, Martin  (1907)   Nordmændene i Amerika deres Historie og Rekord (Minneapolis, Minnesota. 1st volume)
Bjork, Kenneth  (1947) Saga in Steel and Concrete (Northfield, Minnesota: Norwegian-American Historical Association. Chapter 9, Pg. 335-338)
 Rygg, Andreas Nilsen  (1941) Norwegians in New York (Brooklyn NY: The Norwegian News Company, p. 50)
Bergmann, Leola Nelson (1950) Americans from Norway (Philadelphia, Pennsylvania: J.B.Lippincott Co. p. 216)

1839 births
1906 deaths
People from Egersund
Norwegian emigrants to the United States
United States Navy officers
Burials at the United States Naval Academy Cemetery